HIP 14810 b is a massive hot Jupiter approximately 165 light-years away in the constellation of Aries. It has mass 3.88 times that of Jupiter and orbits at 0.0692 AU. It was discovered by the N2K Consortium in 2006 and the discovery paper was published in 2007. Prior to this a preliminary orbit had been published in the Catalog of Nearby Exoplanets.

References

External links
 

Aries (constellation)
Giant planets
Exoplanets discovered in 2006
Exoplanets detected by radial velocity
Hot Jupiters

de:HIP 14810 b